Trineteshwar temple (Devanagari: त्रिनेतेश्वर महादेव मंदिर) is a Lord Shiva temple of Gurjar Pratihar style, located in the Tarnetar village of Surendranagar district, Gujarat. It was built by Mihir Bhoj, in the eighth century.

Trineteshwar Shiva fair
The temple is known for its annual fair, Trinetreshwar Mahadev Mela.

References

Shiva temples in Gujarat
Hindu temples in Gujarat
8th-century Hindu temples
Cultural history of Gujarat
Tourist attractions in Surendranagar district